Rahimanagar B.A.B. High School is a secondary school in Kachua Upazila of Chandpur District, Bangladesh. It was founded by Alhaj Sikander Ali in 1942.
It is one of the best school in Kachua upazila.

References

Board of Intermediate and Secondary Education, Comilla
Address: Laksham Rd, Cumilla 3500
Hours: 
Open ⋅ Closes 5PM
Founded: 1962

Further reading
 http://newsletter-archive.daffodilvarsity.edu.bd/displayimage.php?pid=1108
 https://www.youtube.com/watch?v=HSMDJwRbLuU

Educational institutions established in 1942
High schools in Bangladesh
1942 establishments in India